The Vicariate Apostolic of San Andrés y Providencia in the Catholic Church is located in the town of San Andrés, San Andrés y Providencia in Colombia.

History
On 20 June 1912 Pius X established the Mission "Sui Iuris" of San Andrés y Providencia from the Archdiocese of Cartagena.  Pope Pius XII elevated the mission to a Prefecture Apostolic on 14 November 1946.  John Paul II elevated it to a Vicariate Apostolic on 5 December 2000.

Ordinaries
 Fr. Riccardo Turner, M.H.M. † (1912–1926) Died
 Fr. Eugenio (Juan Bautista) da Carcagente (Soler Rodríguez), O.F.M. Cap. † (23 Jul 1926 – 21 Oct 1952) Died
 Fr. Gaspar (José) Pérez Pérez (de Orihuela), O.F.M. Cap. † (9 Jan 1953 – 1965) Died
 Fr. Alfonso Robledo de Manizales, O.F.M. Cap. † (11 Jan 1966 – 1972) Died
 Fr. Antonio Ferrándiz Morales, O.F.M. Cap. † (24 Mar 1972 – 10 Nov 1998) Died
 Bp. Eulises González Sánchez (5 Dec 2000 – April 16, 2016)
 Bp. Jaime Uriel Sanabria Arias (April 16, 2016 – Present)

See also
Roman Catholicism in Colombia

Sources

Apostolic vicariates
Roman Catholic dioceses in Colombia
Christian organizations established in 1912
1912 establishments in Colombia